Martha Elizabeth Colwell (May 24, 1881 – October 18, 1961 ) was an American printmaker, typographer, and writer.

Life
Colwell was born in Bronson, Michigan; according to the 1880 United States census, her family, including parents Elisha and Nancy, and siblings, Frederic, Albert, Fernando, William and Laura, lived on a farm at Burr Oak.

Education
Colwell studied at the School of the Art Institute of Chicago Her instructors included John Vanderpoel and Bror Julius Olsson Nordfeldt, the latter of whom instructed her in the art of Japanese woodblock printing. After becoming acquainted with Thomas Wood Stevens in 1899 she began contributing illustrations and poetry to editions of the magazine The Blue Sky.

Career

During her career Colwell worked in advertising, and she was known for her hand-lettered newspaper advertisements. In 1909 she published a book of poetry, Songs and Sonnets, which she designed and illustrated herself; she published other such books during her career. 1910 saw the publication of the volume On the Making of Wood-Block-Color Prints. For American Type Founders Colwell designed the 1916 display typeface Colwell Handletter and its italic. A 1947 exhibition on the history of type design in American noted her place as the only American female type designer known at that time.

She was associated with the Works Progress Administration during the 1930s; one of her paintings from the period,  Bowl of Fruit in watercolor and tempera on panel, is currently owned by Western Illinois University. Several other works are in the collection of the Fine Arts Museums of San Francisco. Colwell exhibited widely throughout her career, and was a member of the Chicago Society of Artists and the Chicago and New York Societies of Etchers.

References

 "Findagrave" Elizabeth Colwell, https://www.findagrave.com/memorial/58548625/elizabeth-martha-colwell

External links
 American Type Founders specimen book, 1923 - Colwell Handletter is shown extensively on pages 292-7

1881 births
1954 deaths
American women printmakers
19th-century American printmakers
20th-century American printmakers
20th-century American women artists
American typographers and type designers
American women poets
20th-century American poets
20th-century American women writers
People from Branch County, Michigan
Artists from Michigan
Poets from Michigan
Artists from Chicago
Writers from Chicago
Poets from Illinois
School of the Art Institute of Chicago alumni
Federal Art Project artists
Works Progress Administration in Illinois
People from St. Joseph County, Michigan
19th-century American women artists
Women graphic designers